Mitchell is a community in the municipality of West Perth, part of Perth County, Ontario, Canada. Mitchell is no longer a separate entity. On January 1, 1998, the town amalgamated with the neighbouring Townships of Logan, Fullarton, and Hibbert to form the new Municipality of West Perth.

History 
Mitchell was named for a settler of the same name who built a small shanty on the nearby Thames River.  "Perhaps the only place name in Ontario named for a negro".  Post office opened in 1842.

According to a historic plaque erected by the Province, the Canada Company laid out a town plot (Mitchell) on the Huron Road in 1836. In 1837 a log building was built by William Hicks along Huron Road; this was the first settlement in the area.  A sawmill was built in 1842, and in 1845, stores and other mills opened. By 1851 the population had reached 150. Mitchell was incorporated as a Village in 1857, after the railway reached the area. Mitchell became a Town in 1874, with a population of 2000. The first mayor was Thomas Matheson. A waterworks system was built in 1889; roadways and sidewalks were paved. Electricity arrived in 1889. By 1901, the population had grown to 2,200. In 1918, a large new elementary school was necessary. A high school was built soon after.

Economy 
The  town's major employers include Parmalat Canada (the former Stacey Brothers creamery), a producer of dairy products, and Cooper Standard Automotive, the Canadian centre for the American company's automotive parts research and development program. Mitchell is an agricultural service centre, surrounded by high-quality farmland. Great Lakes Specialty Meats, a pork producer, has expanded significantly with assistance from Agriculture and Agrifood Canada. In 2011, Mitchell's average per person income was $40,688.

Municipal government 
Mitchell is part of the Municipality of West Perth and governed accordingly. The Municipality has a Mayor, Deputy Mayor and nine Councillors; three of these represents the Mitchell Ward. The current Mitchell councillors are Phillip O'Donnell, Murray Rose and Doug Feltz. The Mayor is Walter McKenzie, and the Deputy Mayor is W. Dean Trentowsky.

Sports 
Mitchell has a number of hockey, baseball, and ringette teams, and is home to the Mitchell Hawks, a junior hockey team that plays in the PJHL.

Mitchell is the birthplace of professional ice hockey player Howie Morenz. He began his career with the Mitchell Juveniles, 1917–18, and moved to Stratford where he played with several teams there. In 1923 he joined the Montreal Canadiens of the National Hockey League. He remained in the League for 14 years, 12 with Montreal. In 1950 Morenz was voted the outstanding hockey player of the half century by Canadian Press. He was one of the initial nine inductees into the Hockey Hall of Fame.

Education 
In the educational sector, Mitchell has two schools, Upper Thames Elementary and Mitchell District High School.
Upper Thames Elementary School is a school from J.K. to 6. This school was built in 1970 to serve the rural population (from the former Townships of Logan, Fullarton, and Hibbert), and replaced numerous one and two room schoolhouses in the rural areas.  It is a school that has many activities and fundraisers.  In recent years, grade 7 and 8 children from the former Town of Mitchell started attending MDHS, with all town children now attending since the closure of Mitchell Public School in 2010.

Mitchell District High School, otherwise known as MDHS, is a secondary school serving grades  7-12. The building, constructed in the late 1950s, is shaped as a square with an open courtyard in the middle, and is one level; there are no stairs which makes it wheelchair accessible. The building replaced a building on St. David Street which now serves as the municipal office for the Municipality of West Perth.  Although a small high school, it has a good range of programs, including music, sports and mechanics, and many extra-curricular activities.

Wildlife 
Mitchell is located in southwestern Ontario, which has many small rivers and forests patched throughout the landscape. The Thames River runs through the heart of Mitchell, and dense brush and forests run along the northern and southern edges of the town. The brush and forest contain commonly seen animals such as Bufo fowleri, red fox, striped skunk, eastern gray squirrel, eastern cottontail, and the white-tailed deer. The Thames River is home to many varieties of fish, including but not limited to, common carp, mirror carp, chub, rock bass, redeye bass, perch, suckers, crayfish, clams, and minnows. The dam in the Thames River is known as the best fishing spot in Mitchell, as it has a 5–6 feet deep pool at the bottom where the majority of the carp are seen and caught. Once caught, some fishers will release the carp into the open river, therefore extending the range in the Thames that have carp.

Mitchell is also home to the West Perth Wetlands, a location frequented by migratory bird species. It has become a popular spot for Birders from all over Ontario and parts of the U.S. The site was converted from a decommissioned sewage lagoon and includes two ponds that provide two distinct habitats for birds, a shallow front pond for shorebirds and dabbling ducks and a deeper back pond for ducks, swans and geese to swim.http://www.mitchelladvocate.com/2015/10/19/west-perth-wetlands-a-hotspot-for-birds-birders-alike

Places of worship 
 Bethel Free Reformed Church (Free Reformed Churches of North America)
 St. Vincent De Paul Roman Catholic Church
 Trinity Anglican Church (Rev. Karine Farmer)
 Upper Thames Missionary Church (Rev. Ralph VanOostveen)
 Knox Presbyterian Church (Rev. Dr. David Thompson)
 Main Street United Church
 Grace Evangelical Lutheran Church

References

External links 
 Municipality of West Perth
 Mitchell Advocate, the community's weekly newspaper
 Mitchell, ON Weather, from The Weather Network.
 History of Mitchell, Ontario William Johnston; History of Perth County 1825-1902 Chapter XXV, Stratford 1903
 Downtown blaze in Mitchell, article on the fire of April 15, 2010

Former towns in Ontario
Communities in Perth County, Ontario